Rhinoscapha funebris is a species of true weevil family. It occurs in Papua New Guinea.

References 

 Zipcodezoo
 Global species

funebris
Entiminae
Beetles described in 1880